Aaron Nguimbat (born 13 March 1978) is a Cameroonian former professional footballer who played as a defender. He represented Cameroon at the 2000 Sydney Olympics where he won a gold medal.

References

External links
 
 
 

Living people
1978 births
Association football defenders
Cameroonian footballers
Canon Yaoundé players
Expatriate footballers in Latvia
Cameroonian expatriates in Latvia
Expatriate footballers in Indonesia
Cameroonian expatriates in Indonesia
Footballers at the 2000 Summer Olympics
Liga 1 (Indonesia) players
Medalists at the 2000 Summer Olympics
Olympic footballers of Cameroon
Olympic gold medalists for Cameroon
Olympic medalists in football